Literary fragments may comprise:

 works inadvertently left unfinished or never completed by their authors
 surviving extracts of larger works subsequently lost as wholes
 works deliberately constructed as fragmentary pieces

The deliberately undeveloped literary sort of fragment played an especially important role in literary Romanticism. German literature of the Romantic period has left many such fragments. In English literature, note Coleridge's unfinished (but published as a fragment in 1816) "Kubla Khan; or, A Vision in a Dream: A Fragment".
In contemporary literature Dimitris Lyacos employs fragment sequences in order to develop an elliptical narrative alluding to a universe of unattainability and loss.

See also 
 Fragmente der griechischen Historiker

References 

Literature